Terence B. Davis II (born May 16, 1997) is an American professional basketball player for the Sacramento Kings of the National Basketball Association (NBA). He played college basketball for the Ole Miss Rebels. After going undrafted in the 2019 NBA draft, he signed with the Toronto Raptors and was named to the NBA All-Rookie Second Team in 2020.

Early life
Davis is the son of Trinita Smith and Terence Davis, Sr. He began playing basketball at the age of six. He became a star football player at Southaven High School, competing as a wide receiver. Davis earned twenty scholarship offers from major universities for football but opted to pursue basketball in college instead.

College career
Davis played sparingly as a freshman at Ole Miss, averaging 1.9 points and 6.9 minutes per game. Coach Andy Kennedy's advice was to become a ball-getter and he improved markedly as a sophomore, becoming one of the most improved players in all of college basketball, and scoring 30 points on 6-for-7 3-pointers in an NIT win over Syracuse. He averaged 14.9 points and 5.3 rebounds per game as a sophomore. In his junior season, Davis led the team in scoring with 13.8 points per game, while contributing 6.2 rebounds and 2.1 assists per game. 

After the season, coach Kennedy was fired and Kermit Davis, who was named SEC coach of the year in 2019, was tapped as the new coach. As a senior, Davis posted 15.2 points, 5.8 rebounds and 3.5 assists per game while shooting his best 3-point percentage and free throw percentage of his career at 37.1% and 77.2% respectively. He was named SEC player of the week after scoring 27 points and pulling down 12 rebounds, in a win over Auburn on January 9, 2019. Davis was named to the Second-team All-SEC. During his career at Ole Miss, Davis led the team to the NCAA tournament for the ninth time in school history. After the season Davis participated in the Portsmouth Invitational Tournament and was named to the All-Tournament Team.

Professional career

Toronto Raptors (2019–2021)
After going undrafted in the 2019 NBA draft, Davis joined the Denver Nuggets for the NBA Summer League. On July 11, 2019, Davis signed a two-year deal with the Toronto Raptors, with a full guarantee in year one. On October 22, 2019, Davis made his debut in NBA, coming off the bench in a 130–122 overtime win over the New Orleans Pelicans with five points, five rebounds, two assists and two steals. On November 20, Davis put up impressive numbers in 113–97 win over the Orlando Magic, scoring 19 points and grabbing 8 rebounds. On January 8, in his first career start, Davis scored 23 points to go along with 11 rebounds and 5 assists, leading the Raptors to a 112–110 overtime win against the Charlotte Hornets.  On February 2, 2020, Davis scored a career-high 31 points against the Chicago Bulls. During the NBA hiatus, he worked out in Miami. Including the seeding games in the 2020 NBA Bubble, Davis was the only Raptor to play all 72 regular season games for the 2019–20 season. On September 15, 2020, Davis was named 2019–20 NBA All-Rookie Second Team by the NBA.

Sacramento Kings (2021–present)
On March 25, 2021, Davis was traded to the Sacramento Kings in exchange for a 2021 second-round draft pick. He made his Kings debut two days later, recording six points, two rebounds and two assists in a 100–98 win over the Cleveland Cavaliers.

On August 7, 2021, Davis re-signed with the Kings. He scored a career-high 35 points in a 133–131 loss to the Detroit Pistons on January 19, 2022. On February 1, 2022, Davis underwent wrist surgery and was ruled out for three months, effectively ending the rest of his regular season run.

On November 15, 2022, Davis scored 31 points, grabbed nine rebounds, and recorded three steals and seven 3 pointers at 70% field goal shooting, in a 153–121 win over the Brooklyn Nets.

Career statistics

NBA

Regular season 

|-
| style="text-align:left;"| 
| style="text-align:left;"| Toronto
| 72 || 4 || 16.8 || .456 || .388 || .864 || 3.3 || 1.6 || .5 || .2 || 7.5
|-
| style="text-align:left;" rowspan=2| 
| style="text-align:left;"| Toronto
| 34 || 4 || 14.5 || .414 || .361 || .889 || 1.9 || 1.1 || .5 || .2 || 6.9
|-
| style="text-align:left;"| Sacramento
| 27 || 0 || 21.5 || .439 || .372 || .784 || 3.3 || 1.7 || 1.0 || .3 || 11.1
|-
| style="text-align:left;"| 
| style="text-align:left;"| Sacramento
| 30 || 11 || 17.9 || .423 || .329 || .818 || 3.1 || 1.3 || .8 || .4 || 10.4
|- class="sortbottom"
| style="text-align:center;" colspan="2"| Career
| 163 || 19 || 17.3 || .437 || .366 || .835 || 3.0 || 1.5 || .7 || .2 || 8.5

Playoffs

|-
| style="text-align:left;"| 2020
| style="text-align:left;"| Toronto
| 6 || 0 || 14.0 || .483 || .421 || 1.000 || 2.2 || 1.2 || .2 || .0 || 7.2
|- class="sortbottom"
| style="text-align:center;" colspan="2"| Career
| 6 || 0 || 14.0 || .483 || .421 || 1.000 || 2.2 || 1.2 || .2 || .0 || 7.2

College

|-
| style="text-align:left;"| 2015–16
| style="text-align:left;"| Ole Miss
| 20 || 0 || 6.6 || .433 || .273 || .368 || .9 || .3 || .4 || .1 || 1.8
|-
| style="text-align:left;"| 2016–17
| style="text-align:left;"| Ole Miss
| 36 || 26 || 25.3 || .482 || .333 || .723 || 5.3 || 1.8 || 1.4 || .5 || 14.9
|-
| style="text-align:left;"| 2017–18
| style="text-align:left;"| Ole Miss
| 32 || 24 || 27.3 || .407 || .317 || .720 || 6.2 || 2.1 || .9 || .9 || 13.8
|-
| style="text-align:left;"| 2018–19
| style="text-align:left;"| Ole Miss
| 33 || 32 || 31.0 || .444 || .371 || .772 || 5.8 || 3.5 || 1.6 || .6 || 15.2
|- class="sortbottom"
| style="text-align:center;" colspan="2"| Career
| 121 || 82 || 24.3 || .445 || .339 || .717 || 4.9 || 2.1 || 1.2 || .6 || 12.5

Personal life
Davis was arrested in New York City on October 27, 2020, after allegedly assaulting his girlfriend. The charges were reportedly dropped a few months later.

References

External links
Ole Miss Rebels bio
NBA bio

1997 births
Living people
American expatriate basketball people in Canada
American men's basketball players
Basketball players from Mississippi
Ole Miss Rebels men's basketball players
People from Southaven, Mississippi
Point guards
Sacramento Kings players
Toronto Raptors players
Undrafted National Basketball Association players